Vasily Lvovich Velichko (14 July 1860, in Priluki, Poltava Governorate, Russian Empire (now Pryluky, Poltava Oblast, Ukraine) – 13 January 1904, in Saint Petersburg) was a Russian Imperial politician, who served in the Ministry of Justice of the Russian Empire. He was also a poet, playwright and publicist, one of the leaders of Russian Assembly, and editor of the semi-official Kavkaz gazette. 

Known as a Russian chauvinist, he demonstrated blatant intolerance to the Armenian people and tried to set them on other populations in the  Caucasus. He was active during the period when the Imperial Russian authorities carried out a purposeful anti-Armenian policy. 

According to the Russian historian Victor Schnirelmann, "it is curious that his works were re-published in Azerbaijan in the early 1990s and received wide popularity there". Velichko's "forgotten racist tract" was reissued by Ziya Bunyadov's academy.

References

1860 births
1903 deaths
Politicians of the Russian Empire
Russian journalists
Russian nationalists